Tin&Tina is an upcoming psychological thriller film with horror elements directed by Rubin Stein, which stars Milena Smit and Jaime Lorente alongside Carlos González Morollón and Anastasia Russo. It is an adaptation on the 2013 short film of the same name.

Plot 
The plot is set in early-1980s Spain. It tracks the plight of Adolfo and Lola (the latter of whom has endured an unwanted abortion plunging her into a crisis of faith), as well as Tin and Tina, two creepy orphan twin siblings educated under strict religious teachings in a convent, ensuingly adopted by Adolfo and Lola.

Cast

Production 

Tin&Tina is the feature film adaptation of the 2013 short film of the same name directed by Rubin Stein.

Shooting began on 27 July 2021. It wrapped after 7 weeks, by September 2021. Shot in the province of Seville, shooting locations included the Hacienda San Felipe in Gerena and the Monastery of San Isidoro del Campo in Santiponce.

Release 
Filmax secured the film's domestic distribution in Spain. It has a tentative theatrical release date in Spain set for 24 March 2023.

See also 
 List of Spanish films of 2023

References

External links
 

Spanish horror thriller films
Films set in the 1980s
Films set in Spain
Spanish psychological thriller films
Psychological horror films
Films shot in the province of Seville
Films about adoption
Features based on short films
La Claqueta PC films
Films about dysfunctional families
Upcoming Spanish-language films
Religious horror films
Films scored by Jocelyn Pook
2023 horror thriller films